This list includes all reptiles found in Aegean Islands. It does not include species found only in captivity or those which are extinct. Each species is listed, with its binomial name and notes on its distribution where this is limited.

Summary of 2006 IUCN Red List categories.
Conservation status - IUCN Red List of Threatened Species:
 - Extinct,  - Extinct in the wild
 - Critically endangered,  - Endangered,  - Vulnerable
 - Near threatened,  - Least concern
 - Data deficient,  - Not evaluated
(v. 2013.2, the data is current as of March 5, 2014)

Turtles

Family: Testudinidae (tortoises)
Spur-thighed tortoise, Testudo graeca  (southern Europe)
Marginated tortoise, Testudo marginata  (southern Europe)
Family: Cheloniidae
Loggerhead sea turtle, Caretta caretta  (southern Europe)

Lizards and snakes

Lizards
Family: Agamidae (agamas)
Stellion, Agama stellio (Greek islands)
Family: Gekkonidae (geckos)
Kotschy's gecko, Cyrtodactylus kotschyi  (southern Europe)
Mediterranean house gecko, Hemidactylus turcicus  (southern Europe)
Family: Lacertidae (wall or true lizards)
Subfamily: Lacertinae
Tribe: Eremiadini
Snake-eyed lizard, Ophisops elegans (Mediterranean and Central Asia)
Tribe: Lacertini
Balkan green lizard, Lacerta trilineata  (south-eastern Europe)
Common wall lizard, Podarcis muralis 
Erhard's wall lizard, Podarcis erhardii  (south-eastern Europe)
Family: Scincidae (Skinks)
Ocellated skink, Chalcides ocellatus (Greece, Sicily and Sardinia)
Family: Anguidae
European glass lizard, Ophisaurus apodus (south-eastern Europe)

Snakes
Family: Typhlopidae (blind snakes)
Worm wnake, Typhlops vermicularis (south-eastern Europe)
Family: Boidae (boas)
Sand boa, Eryx jaculus (south-eastern Europe)
Family: Colubridae (Colubrids)
Subfamily: Colubrinae
Caspian whipsnake, Coluber caspius (south-eastern Europe, Turkey)
Dahl's whip snake, Platyceps najadum  (south-eastern Europe)
Collared dwarf racer, Eirenis collaris  (Bulgaria, Turkey, Georgia)
Leopard snake, Zamenis situla  (southern Europe)
Aesculapian snake, Zamenis longissimus 
Subfamily: Psammophiinae
Montpellier snake, Malpolon monspessulanus  (southern Europe)
Subfamily: Natricinae
Grass snake, Natrix natrix 
Family: Viperidae
Ottoman viper, Montivipera xanthina  (Greece)

See also
List of reptiles of Turkey
List of reptiles of Italy
List of reptiles of Europe

References

Aegean